Shah Bahram (also Romanized as Shāh Bahrām; also known as Shāh Barān and Showrūn) is a village in Kheyrgu Rural District, Alamarvdasht District, Lamerd County, Fars Province, Iran. At the 2006 census, its population was 124, in 27 families.

References 

Populated places in Lamerd County